The Gawad Urian Best Actress, (officially, the Pinakamahusay na Pangunahing Aktres), is a movie award given by the Manunuri ng Pelikulang Pilipino (Filipino Film Critics) to lead actresses in a Philippine movie.

Winners and nominees
In the lists below, the winner of the award for each year is shown first, followed by the other nominees.

1970s

1980s

1990s

2000s

2010s

Superlatives

Nora was nominated 5 consecutive times twice in her career. the first one is from 1978–1982 and from 2012–2016.

Multiple awards for Best Actress
Eight awards 
Vilma Santos

Seven awards 
Nora Aunor

Three awards
Gina Alajar
Jaclyn Jose

Two Awards
Cherry Pie Picache

References

Film awards for lead actress
Philippine film awards
Awards established in 1976